Hilarographa refluxana is a species of moth of the family Tortricidae. It is found in Rio de Janeiro, Brazil.

The dorsal half of the forewings has an orange ground colour, with brown lines perpendicular to the dorsum.

References

Moths described in 1863
Hilarographini